Phyllonorycter dubitella is a moth of the family Gracillariidae. It is found from Fennoscandia and northern Russia to the Pyrenees, Italy and Bulgaria and from Great Britain to Ukraine.

The wingspan is about 8 mm. There are two generations per year with adults on wing in May and June and again in August.

The larvae feed on Salix caprea. They mine the leaves of their host plant. They create a large, lower-surface tentiform mine, mostly between two side veins. The upperside is strongly inflated. The underside has many narrow folds. The pupa is light brown and made in a golden cocoon. The frass is deposited in a corner of the mine.

References

External links
 

dubitella
Moths described in 1855
Moths of Europe
Taxa named by Gottlieb August Wilhelm Herrich-Schäffer